Steven Dubinsky (born July 9, 1970) is a Canadian former professional ice hockey player who played in the NHL with the Chicago Blackhawks, Calgary Flames, Nashville Predators, and St. Louis Blues. He played centre and shot left-handed.

Biography
Dubinsky was born in Montreal, Quebec, Canada, and is Jewish. As a youth, he played in the 1982 and 1983 Quebec International Pee-Wee Hockey Tournaments with a minor ice hockey team from the North Shore of Montreal.

Dubinsky was drafted in the 11th round, 226th overall in the 1990 NHL Entry Draft. From there he played for Clarkson University, where he played right wing from 1989-1993 for the Clarkson Golden Knights men's ice hockey team, led the team in scoring his junior year, was named a 1992 Eastern College Athletic Conference (ECAC) All-Star honorable mention, and played with future NHLers Craig Conroy and Todd Marchant. After college Dubinsky reported to the Indianapolis Ice of the IHL where he played the majority of the 1993–1994 season before playing 28 games with the Blackhawks that same season.

Dubinsky bounced between the Ice and the Blackhawks before finally earning a full-time roster spot with the Blackhawks for the 1997–98 season. That year he played in all 82 games and scored a career high 18 points. The following season he played one game with the Blackhawks before being traded to the Calgary Flames. He played there for 2 years before rejoining the Blackhawks for the 2000–01 season. The 2001–02 season saw Dubinsky being traded yet again from the Blackhawks, this time to the Nashville Predators. Dubinsky then signed as a free agent with the St. Louis Blues for the 2002–03, but a head injury during the season limited him to only 28 games, and he retired following the season.  

He currently works for Glacier Ice Arena in Vernon Hills, Illinois. His ex-wife's name is Cheryl, and they have three sons. His son Zach Dubinsky plays college hockey for the Rensselaer Polytechnic Institute Engineers.

Career statistics

See also
List of select Jewish ice hockey players

References

External links

1970 births
Living people
Anglophone Quebec people
Calgary Flames players
Canadian ice hockey centres
Chicago Blackhawks draft picks
Chicago Blackhawks players
Clarkson Golden Knights men's ice hockey players
Ice hockey people from Montreal
Indianapolis Ice players
Jewish Canadian sportspeople
Jewish ice hockey players
Milwaukee Admirals players
Nashville Predators players
Norfolk Admirals players
People from Vernon Hills, Illinois
St. Louis Blues players
Worcester IceCats players